Farmoor is a village  west of the centre of Oxford, England. The village was part of Berkshire until the 1974 local government boundary changes transferred it to Oxfordshire. Farmoor has a village shop, filling station and a small business park called Farmoor Court. Historically the Farmoor area was called the tything of Stroud. Farmoor Common was an open field within the tything. It is now submerged under the reservoir. The village was developed in the early decades of the 20th century and took its name from the Common.

There is now the church of Saint Mary, Farmoor that was built as a chapel of ease. Farmoor Reservoir was built in 1967 and extended in 1976. It has a number of wetland nature areas. BBC Television used Oaken Holt Rest Home in Eynsham Road, Farmoor, as a location for the 1990s sitcom Waiting for God.

See also
Azad University IR in Oxford

References

External links
Farmoor Village

Grid reference 

Villages in Oxfordshire
Vale of White Horse